As part of the Apollo program by NASA, 24 astronauts flew 9 missions to the Moon between December 1968 and December 1972. During six successful two-man landing missions, 12 men walked on the lunar surface, six of whom drove Lunar Roving Vehicles as part of the last three missions. Three men have been to the Moon twice, one only orbited both times, while the other two landed once apiece. Apart from these 24 men, no human being has gone beyond low Earth orbit. No woman has been to the Moon, but a number of non-human animals have orbited it, including two tortoises and five mice.

Apollo missions 8 and 10–17 were the nine crewed missions to the Moon. Apollo 4–6 and AS-201 and AS-202 were uncrewed, while AS-203 is considered a test flight. The Apollo program included three other crewed missions – Apollo 1 (AS-204) did not launch and its crew died in a ground-based capsule fire, while Apollo 7 and Apollo 9 were low Earth orbit missions that only tested spacecraft components and docking maneuvers. Apollo missions 18, 19, and 20 were canceled. Nine astronauts later flew unused Apollo command modules in the Apollo Applications Program's Skylab and Apollo–Soyuz Test Project. Of the 24 astronauts who flew to the Moon, two went on to command a Skylab mission, one commanded Apollo–Soyuz, one flew as commander for Approach and Landing Tests of the Space Shuttle, and two commanded orbital Space Shuttle missions.

Prime crew members 
NASA's Director of Flight Crew Operations during the Gemini and Apollo programs was Donald K. "Deke" Slayton, one of the original Mercury Seven astronauts, who was medically grounded in September 1962 due to a minor cardiac arrhythmia – paroxysmal atrial fibrillation. Slayton was responsible for making all Gemini and Apollo crew assignments. In March 1972, Slayton was restored to flight status, and flew on the 1975 Apollo–Soyuz Test Project mission.

The prime crew members selected for actual missions are here grouped by their NASA astronaut selection groups, and within each group in the order selected for flight. Two versions of the Apollo Command/Service Module (CSM) spacecraft were developed: Block I, intended for preliminary low Earth orbit testing; and Block II, redesigned for the lunar landing. The Block I crew position titles were Command Pilot, Senior Pilot (second seat), and Pilot (third seat).  The corresponding Block II titles were: Commander, Command Module Pilot, and Lunar Module Pilot. The second seat pilot was given secondary responsibility for celestial navigation to keep the CSM's guidance computer accurately calibrated with the spacecraft's true position, and the third seat pilot served as a flight engineer, monitoring the health of the spacecraft systems.

Apollo astronauts by their dates of selection by NASA

1959 

 Virgil I. "Gus" Grissom began his career at NASA in 1959. In 1966, he was selected as Command Pilot for the first crewed Apollo mission, a low Earth orbit test. This mission ended a month before its scheduled launch, when a cabin fire on the launch pad killed Grissom, Ed White and Roger Chaffee on January 27, 1967.
 Walter M. Schirra Jr. also began his NASA career in 1959.  He was selected in October 1968 as Command Pilot for Apollo 7, an 11-day, low Earth orbit shakedown test of the three-man Apollo Command/Service Module and the first crewed launch for the Apollo project.
 Alan B. Shepard Jr. – America's first man in space on Freedom 7 was originally selected to command Gemini 3, but was medically grounded for the duration of Gemini due to Ménière's disease and assisted Slayton in Flight Operations. After corrective surgery, Shepard was restored to flight status and commanded Apollo 14, the third successful Moon landing mission.

1962

All of these astronauts flew on Gemini, and except for White, each commanded one Gemini and one Apollo mission:

 Edward H. White II – Second-seat veteran of Gemini 4 who made the United States' first walk in space, selected as Senior Pilot (second seat) on Apollo 1. White was killed in the Apollo 1 fire along with Grissom and Chaffee.
 James A. McDivitt – Commander of Gemini 4, selected in late 1966 to command the first Earth orbital flight test of the Apollo Lunar Module with the CSM. This mission flew in March 1969 as Apollo 9. After his flight, McDivitt was promoted to Manager of Lunar Landing Operations, and in August 1969 was promoted to Manager of the Apollo Spacecraft Program.
 Frank F. Borman II – Commander of Gemini 7, selected to command a higher Earth orbit test of the complete Apollo spacecraft. But when delays prevented the LM from being ready in time for its first flight in December 1968, Borman's mission was changed to the first lunar orbital flight of the CSM on Apollo 8.
 James A. Lovell Jr. – Second-seat veteran of Gemini 7, and commander of Gemini 12, flew as Command Module Pilot (second seat) on Apollo 8. Lovell became the first to fly a second Apollo mission as commander of Apollo 13, the third lunar landing attempt. This mission was unsuccessful, due to a Service Module electrical system failure caused by an oxygen tank explosion. Lovell and his crew managed to return to Earth safely.  Lovell is the only person to fly to the Moon twice without landing there.
 Thomas P. Stafford – Second-seat veteran of Gemini 6A and commander of Gemini 9A, commanded a lunar orbital test of the Lunar Module on Apollo 10. He also commanded the Apollo–Soyuz Test Project mission.
 John W. Young – Second-seat veteran of Gemini 3 and commander of Gemini 10, flew as Command Module Pilot on Apollo 10. Young later commanded the successful Apollo 16 lunar landing. He also commanded the first Space Shuttle flight, STS-1 Columbia, April 12–14, 1981, and STS-9, also on Columbia, November 28–December 8, 1983.
 Neil A. Armstrong – Commander of Gemini 8, commanded Apollo 11, becoming the first human to set foot on the Moon.
 Charles "Pete" Conrad Jr. – Second-seat veteran of Gemini 5 and commander of Gemini 11, commanded Apollo 12, the second lunar landing.  He went on to command Skylab 2, successfully completing repairs to the spacecraft that saved it for this and two subsequent missions.

1963

This was the first class of astronauts for which test pilot experience was not required, but military jet fighter pilot experience was acceptable.

Five of this group got their first spaceflight experience as second seat on Gemini:
 David R. Scott – Second-seat veteran of Gemini 8, flew as Command Module Pilot on Apollo 9, and commanded the Apollo 15 lunar landing.
 Eugene A. Cernan – Second-seat veteran on Gemini 9A, flew as Lunar Module Pilot on Apollo 10, and commanded the final lunar landing mission Apollo 17.
 Michael Collins – Second-seat veteran on Gemini 10, flew as Command Module Pilot on Apollo 11.
 Edwin E. "Buzz" Aldrin Jr. – Second-seat veteran on Gemini 12, flew as Lunar Module Pilot on Apollo 11, the first Moon landing.
 Richard F. Gordon Jr. – Second-seat veteran on Gemini 11, flew as Command Module Pilot on Apollo 12. Gordon was selected to command the Apollo 18 lunar landing, which was later canceled.

The remaining six members of this group were selected for their first space flights on Apollo:
 Roger B. Chaffee – Selected as Pilot (third seat) on Apollo 1, was killed with Grissom and White in the fire.
 Donn F. Eisele – Flew second seat on Apollo 7.
 R. Walter Cunningham – Flew third seat on Apollo 7.
 Russell L. "Rusty" Schweickart – Flew as Lunar Module Pilot on Apollo 9. Schweickart performed an EVA outside the spacecraft, testing the portable life support system used on the Moon.
 William A. Anders – Flew third seat on Apollo 8.
 Alan L. Bean – Flew as Lunar Module Pilot on Apollo 12. He later served as commander for Skylab 3.

1965

In June 1965, NASA named a group of five scientist astronauts, the first group qualified by doctorate degrees rather than test or military fighter pilot experience.  Geologist Harrison H. "Jack" Schmitt participated heavily in the geological training of the lunar landing astronauts, as well as assisting in the analysis of returned samples and the preparation of mission reports. In 1970, he was selected as Lunar Module Pilot for the Apollo 15 backup crew, and prime crew on Apollo 18. When program cutbacks canceled missions 18 through 20, NASA's lunar geological community insisted on having a geologist on the Moon, so Slayton reassigned Schmitt to Apollo 17.

1966

NASA named a group of 19 more astronauts in April 1966.  None had spaceflight experience before their Apollo mission.
 T. Kenneth Mattingly II – Selected as prime Command Module Pilot for Apollo 13, Mattingly was exposed to German measles days before the flight and was grounded by the flight surgeon, though ultimately did not contract the disease. He swapped places with his backup and flew on Apollo 16.  He also flew on STS-4 and STS-51-C
 John L. "Jack" Swigert Jr. – Flew as Mattingly's backup on Apollo 13.
 Fred W. Haise Jr. – Flew as Lunar Module Pilot on the unsuccessful Apollo 13. Haise was selected to command the Apollo 19 lunar landing, which was canceled. Haise would later be named commander of the first crew for the Space Shuttle's Approach and Landing Tests using the prototype Space Shuttle Enterprise.
 Stuart A. Roosa – Command Module Pilot on Apollo 14
 Edgar D. Mitchell – Lunar Module Pilot on Apollo 14
 Alfred M. Worden – Command Module Pilot on Apollo 15
 James B. Irwin – Lunar Module Pilot on Apollo 15
 Charles M. Duke Jr. – First achieved public recognition as capsule communicator during the Apollo 11 Moon landing; notable for the quote: "...we copy you on the ground. You've got a bunch of guys about to turn blue; we're breathing again. Thanks a lot." Duke flew as Lunar Module Pilot on Apollo 16.
 Ronald E. Evans Jr. – Command Module Pilot on Apollo 17.

Astronauts who trained for Apollo but did not fly
 L. Gordon Cooper Jr. – from the Mercury Seven; veteran of Mercury Faith 7 and commander of Gemini 5, was replaced as Apollo 14 commander by Alan Shepard and resigned from NASA in 1970.
 Clifton C. "C.C." Williams Jr. – from Group 3; was named as Schweickart's Lunar Module Pilot backup crew, but was killed when the T-38 jet he was flying crashed near Tallahassee, Florida on October 5, 1967. He was replaced by Bean, who flew on Apollo 12.
 Vance D. Brand – from Group 5; was on the support crew for Apollo 8 and Apollo 13; was named as Apollo 15 backup Command Module Pilot. Flew on the 1975 Apollo–Soyuz Test Project (not a flight of the Apollo program). He also flew as commander of STS-5, STS-41-B and STS-35.
 Edward G. Givens Jr. – from Group 5; was on the support crew of Apollo 7, but died in a car crash near Houston, Texas on June 6, 1967.
 Joe H. Engle – from Group 5; was originally named as Apollo 17 Lunar Module Pilot, but lost his slot to Schmitt. After Apollo, he flew in the Space Shuttle Approach and Landing Tests, then commanded STS-2 and STS-51-I.

Apollo astronauts who walked on the Moon 
Twelve men walked on the Moon during six Moon landings of the Apollo program between July 1969 and December 1972. All landed on the surface only once, and five missions consisted of two or more surface EVAs. Four of them are alive  Most astronauts at that time came from the military services and were considered to be on active duty during their NASA service. The few exceptions were considered civilian NASA astronauts, regardless of any prior military service.

On the last of their three Apollo 17 extravehicular activities (EVAs), Harrison Schmitt stepped out of the Apollo lunar module onto the surface of the Moon after Gene Cernan, and is therefore the 12th and most recent person to have stepped out onto the Moon. When they re-entered the lunar module Cernan stepped in last, and is therefore (at present) the last person to have walked on the Moon.

Alan Shepard was the oldest person to walk on the Moon, at age 47 years and 80 days. Charles Duke was the youngest, at age 36 years and 201 days.

Jim Lovell and Fred Haise were scheduled to walk on the Moon during the Apollo 13 mission, but the lunar landing was aborted following an explosion in the spacecraft service module en route to the Moon. Haise was again scheduled to walk on the Moon as commander of Apollo 19, but Apollo 18 and Apollo 19 were canceled on September 2, 1970.

Joe Engle had trained on the backup crew for Apollo 14 to explore the Moon with Cernan, but he was replaced by Schmitt on the primary crew for Apollo 17. Schmitt had previously been crewed with Apollo 12 Command Module pilot Dick Gordon in anticipation of Apollo 18, but Schmitt replaced Engle on Apollo 17 after the cancellation of Apollo 18 and Apollo 19, leaving Gordon as the last Apollo astronaut to train extensively for lunar exploration without ever landing on the Moon.

Apollo astronauts who flew to the Moon without landing 
Besides the 12 people who have walked on the Moon, 12 more have flown to within 0.001 lunar distance of its surface. During each of the six missions with successful lunar landings, one astronaut remained in lunar orbit while the other two landed. In addition, the three-person crews of Apollo 8 and Apollo 10 also entered lunar orbit, and the crew of Apollo 13 looped around the Moon on a free-return trajectory.

All nine crewed missions to the Moon took place as part of the Apollo program over a period of just under four years, from 21 December 1968 to 19 December 1972. The 24 people who have flown to the Moon are the only people who have traveled beyond low Earth orbit. Ten of them are alive.

Jim Lovell, John Young, and Eugene Cernan are the only three people to have flown to the Moon twice. Young and Cernan each set foot on it during their respective second lunar missions, while Lovell is the only person to have flown to the Moon twice without landing.

During Cernan's first lunar mission on Apollo 10, he tied the present record set by Bill Anders on Apollo 8 as the youngest person to fly to the Moon. Each was 35 years and 65 days old on his launch date and 35 years and 68 days old when he entered lunar orbit. The oldest person to fly to the Moon was Alan Shepard, who walked on its surface during the Apollo 14 mission. Shepard was 47 years and 74 days old on his launch date and 47 years and 78 days old when he entered lunar orbit.

Jim Lovell and Fred Haise were scheduled to walk on the Moon during the Apollo 13 mission, but the lunar landing was aborted following a major malfunction en route to the Moon. Haise was again scheduled to walk on the Moon as commander of Apollo 19, but Apollo 18 and Apollo 19 were canceled on September 2, 1970. Because of Apollo 13's free-return trajectory, Lovell, Swigert and Haise flew higher above the Moon's 180° meridian (opposite Earth) than anyone else has flown (254 km/158 mi). Coincidentally, due to the Moon's distance from Earth at the time, they simultaneously set the present record for humans' greatest distance from Earth, reaching an altitude of 400,171 km (248,655 mi) above sea level at 0:21 UTC on 15 April 1970.

Lunar activities 
Armstrong descended the lunar module ladder and spoke his famous epigram, "That's one small step for [a] man, one giant leap for mankind." He then went to work on collecting the contingency sample, which was a scoop of the lunar surface collected early in the mission in case there was an emergency. Armstrong took the TV camera off the lunar module and mounted it to a tripod. After that, Aldrin descended the ladder to join Armstrong. Aldrin egressed to the surface about nineteen minutes after Armstrong. They had some trouble planting the American flag into the lunar soil, but were able to secure it into the surface. Aldrin positioned himself in front of a video camera and began experimenting with different locomotion techniques on the surface. During these experiments, Armstrong and Aldrin received a phone call from President Nixon, congratulating them for the successful landing.

Aldrin then set to work documenting the condition of the spacecraft to ensure it was in proper condition for their upcoming launch. After setting up a couple of experiments with Armstrong, Aldrin went to work hammering a tube into the lunar surface to obtain a core sample. Aldrin's EVA ended when they loaded the lunar samples into the spacecraft and tossed out unneeded items, just before sealing the hatch. Armstrong performed the majority of the photography on the surface, which is why there are only five photos of him on the Moon.

Soon after piloting the LM Falcon to a landing at Hadley Rille, Scott accomplished the only stand-up EVA through the lander's top hatch, using it as a high place from which to refine the geology traverses he and Irwin would undertake during the following days. Scott became the first to drive a vehicle on the Moon as he drove the Lunar Roving Vehicle, more than doubling Apollo 14's EVA time. After the final traverse, back outside the LM, Scott performed a demonstration of Galileo's theory that all objects fall at the same rate in vacuum by dropping a hammer and a feather for the television camera.

Irwin came onto the lunar surface soon after his commander, Scott. As the LRV's first passenger, he had an often rough ride as Scott swerved to avoid craters. It was Irwin who, during the second EVA, first spotted the Genesis Rock and aided Scott in collecting this bit of the early lunar crust. A man of deep Christian religious faith, Irwin quoted from Psalms while on the lunar surface and later became an evangelist.

Apollo astronauts who never flew to the Moon 

In addition to the nine lunar missions, there were two crewed flights in the Apollo program that remained in Earth orbit to test fly the spacecraft. Apollo 7 was a crewed test flight of the CSM, and Apollo 9 was a crewed flight test of the CSM and LEM. Of the six astronauts who participated in these missions, five were never rotated to a lunar mission. In addition, the three Skylab missions and Apollo-Soyuz Test Project used crewed CSMs in Earth orbit and are considered part of the Apollo Applications Project. Although Conrad, Bean, and Stafford commanded three of these four flights, the remaining crew members were rookies and thus had long missed the opportunity to fly a Moon mission. Of the seven rookies who flew Skylab, three of them (Paul J. Weitz, Owen K. Garriott, and Jack R. Lousma) would return to space aboard the Space Shuttle. Vance Brand flew on ASTP as Command Module Pilot and would command three Shuttle missions.  Except for Garriott, all Apollo astronauts who also flew on the Shuttle served as commander.

 Walter M. Schirra Jr. – Commander of Apollo 7.
 Donn F. Eisele – Command Module Pilot of Apollo 7
 R. Walter Cunningham – Lunar Module Pilot of Apollo 7
 James A. McDivitt – Commander of Apollo 9
 Russell L. "Rusty" Schweickart – Lunar Module Pilot of Apollo 9
 Joseph P. Kerwin – Science Pilot of Skylab 2
 Paul J. Weitz – Pilot of Skylab 2
 Owen K. Garriott – Science Pilot of Skylab 3
 Jack R. Lousma – Pilot of Skylab 3
 Gerald P. Carr – Commander of Skylab 4
 Edward G. Gibson – Science Pilot of Skylab 4
 William R. Pogue – Pilot of Skylab 4
 Vance D. Brand – Command Module Pilot of Apollo-Soyuz Test Project
 Donald K. Slayton – Docking Module Pilot of Apollo-Soyuz Test Project

Astronauts who died during the Apollo Program 

Three astronauts died on the ground while training for the first crewed Apollo mission, Apollo 1.

References

External links
 
 One Giant Leap for Mankind: 35th Anniversary of Apollo 11, NASA, Michael Makara, accessed July 14, 2006

 
Astronauts by space program
Apollo astronauts
Apollo astronauts
Apollo
Moon-related lists